D519 is a state road in Slavonia region of Croatia connecting Dalj and nearby Vukovar via Borovo Naselje and the D2 state road.

The road, as well as all other state roads in Croatia, is managed and maintained by Hrvatske ceste, state owned company.

Traffic volume 

Traffic is regularly counted and reported by Hrvatske ceste, operator of the road.

Road junctions and populated areas

Sources

State roads in Croatia
Vukovar-Syrmia County
Osijek-Baranja County